The Women's pursuit event of the Biathlon World Championships 2013 was held on February 10, 2013. The fastest 60 athletes of the sprint competition participated over a course of 10 km.

Results
The race started at 16:15.

References

Women's pursuit
2013 in Czech women's sport